Phiale formosa is a species of spider in the family Salticidae (jumping spiders). It is found in Costa Rica.

References

Salticidae
Spiders of Central America
Spiders described in 1909
Taxa named by Nathan Banks